Sındal is a village in the Lapseki District of Çanakkale Province in Turkey. Its population is 56 (2021). It has been referred to as Sındal, Zındal, Sindel, or Sendel by historical sources.

References

Villages in Lapseki District